George Eugene Belknap (January 22, 1832 – 7 April 1903) was a rear admiral in the United States Navy. USS Belknap (DD-251) was named for him.

Naval career
Born in Newport, New Hampshire, Belknap was appointed a Midshipman in 1847. He commanded the monitor  during the attacks on Battle of Fort Fisher, and the sloop-of-war  during the Formosa Expedition of 1867. He was the senior officer present during the riots following David Kalākaua's election as the King of Hawaii in 1874. 

Belknap commanded the United States Naval Observatory from 1885 to 1886 and the Mare Island Naval Shipyard from 1886 to 1890.  Belknap was appointed as a rear admiral on 12 February 1889.  He served as the Commander of the Asiatic Squadron from 4 April 1889 to 20 February 1892.  He retired from the Navy on 22 January 1894.

In August 1902, Belknap and his wife visited the United Kingdom, including Devonport as guests of Rear Admiral William Hannam Henderson, the Admiral Superintendent of the dockyard.

Belknap died at Key West, Florida, 7 April 1903.

Memberships
Belknap was a member of the Grand Army of the Republic, a Veteran Companion of the Military Order of the Loyal Legion of the United States (MOLLUS) and an Honorary Companion of the Military Order of Foreign Wars.  He was also a member of the New Hampshire Society of the Sons of the American Revolution.

Legacy
A portrait of Admiral Belknap is on display in Luce Hall at the United States Naval War College in Newport, Rhode Island.

Family
He was the father of Rear Admiral Reginald R. Belknap who served as national Commander-in-Chief of MOLLUS from 1947 to 1951.

Dates of Rank

Midshipman - October 8, 1847
Passed Midshipman - June 10, 1853
 Master - September 15, 1855

See also

References

 Dates of promotion from The Records of Living Officers of the U.S. Navy and Marine Corps, Sixth Edition, 1889, by Lewis Randolph Hamersly.

Attribution

1832 births
1903 deaths
People from Newport, New Hampshire
United States Navy rear admirals (upper half)
Belknap George
 Union Navy officers